Falconina gracilis is a species of true spider in the family Corinnidae. It is found in Brazil, Paraguay, Argentina, and has been introduced into the United States.

References

Corinnidae
Articles created by Qbugbot
Spiders described in 1891